Pandit Sudhir (born 17 February 1974) is an Indian sitar player of Hindustani classical music. He is known for the vocalistic phrasing of his raga improvisations. He has learnt sitar from the Imdadkhani Gharana, popularly known as the Etawah Gharana.

He is the son of Sampat Lal, a tabla player of Central India. His grandfather, Badri Prasad, was the court musician of the former principality of Raigarh state, situated in the modern state of Chhattisgarh.

Early life
Born in Nagpur, India, he started learning classical singing from his father Sampat Lal and then at the age of seven started learning vocal and sitar from his uncle Jagdish Prasad.

At the age of 14 he started talim (learning/training) in the traditional way under the guidance of Bimalendu Mukherjee as his Guru.

Performing career and achievements
Sudhir has been awarded B High Certificate by All India Radio and has been em-paneled by the Indian Council for Cultural Relations. He is gold medalist Sangeet Visharad from Gandharva Mahamandal. He also received national titles at Khel Yuva Utsav at Pune and Jamshedpur. He has performed at many major musical festivals and prestigious stages in Chhattisgarh and Maharashtra. He has also performed at the prestigious Chakradhar Samaroh at Raighar in the year 2011.

References

1974 births
Hindustani instrumentalists
Living people
Musicians from Nagpur
Sitar players
Indian male classical musicians